Hermann Christian Wilhelm von Strantz  (13 February 1853 in Nakel an der Netze – 3 November 1936 in Dessau) was a Prussian officer, and later General of Infantry during World War I. He was a recipient of Pour le Mérite.

World War I
In 1914, von Strantz was commanding V Corps with headquarters in Posen.  In peacetime the Corps was assigned to the VIII Army Inspectorate but on mobilisation V Corps was assigned to the 5th Army forming part of centre of the forces for the Schlieffen Plan offensive in August 1914 on the Western Front.

Armee-Abteilung Strantz (named for von Strantz while he was in command, but later renamed to Armee-Abteilung C) was formed on 18 September 1914 from the left (southern) wing of the 5th Army.  It initially commanded V Corps and III Bavarian Corps, controlling half a dozen divisions.  Strantz remained as commander of V Corps concurrently but was deputised in this post by a Divisional Commander.

Strantz remained as commander of the Armee-Abteilung until 2 February 1917 when he retired from active service.

Awards
 Iron Cross II Class (1870)
 Iron Cross I Class (1914)  
 Pour le Mérite (22 August 1915)
 Order of the Crown
 Order of the Zähringer Lion
 Bavarian Military Merit Order
 Order of the Red Eagle
 Belgian Order of Leopold
 Order of Albert the Bear
 Legion of Honour

References

Bibliography 
 
 
 [Feldzeitung] Zwischen Maas und Mosel. Armee-Abteilung von Strantz, hrsg. vom Oberkommando der Armee-Abteilung von Strantz, Siegburg ca. 1914-1917
 Holm Kirsten, Das sowjetische Speziallager Nr. 4 Landsberg/Warthe, hrsg. von der Stiftung Gedenkstätten Buchenwald und Mittelbau-Dora, Göttingen 2005 
 Hans Friedrich von Ehrenkrook, Genealogisches Handbuch der adeligen Häuser. Adelige Häuser A Band IV. (= Genealogisches Handbuch des Adels, Band 22 der Gesamtreihe), Glücksburg 1960.
 Hanns Möller: Die Geschichte der Ritter des Ordens „pour le merite“ im Weltkrieg 1914-1918 - Abschnitt: General der Infanterie von Strantz; Deutsches Wehrkundearchiv 2007, DW-34001-00

External links 
 Biography on "The Prussian Machine"

|-

1853 births
1936 deaths
People from Nakło nad Notecią
People from the Province of Posen
Generals of Infantry (Prussia)
Recipients of the Pour le Mérite (military class)
German Army generals of World War I
Recipients of the Iron Cross (1870), 2nd class
Grand Crosses of the Military Merit Order (Bavaria)
Recipients of the Iron Cross (1914), 1st class
Grand Crosses of the Order of Military Merit (Bulgaria)
Officiers of the Légion d'honneur
Commanders of the Order of Saints Maurice and Lazarus
Commanders of the Order of Christ (Portugal)
Recipients of the Order of St. Anna, 1st class
Grand Crosses of Military Merit